Geoffrey Willis (born 23 December 1959) is a British engineer and the Director of Commercial Engineering at the Mercedes Formula One team. He was also the Technical Director of Red Bull Racing team from 2007 to 2009 and Technical Director of Hispania Racing from 2010 to 2011.

In 1987 after a degree at Cambridge University in engineering, he was approached to join the design team of the Peter de Savary's British America's Cup challenge and he spent the next three years designing and developing hull and keel designs for the team in preparation for the competition in San Diego.  Prior to working for Honda, Willis was employed as chief aerodynamicist by the Williams Formula One team and also worked as a consultant at the Leyton House team in the early 1990s. While at Leyton House, Willis met Adrian Newey and it was through this association that he joined Williams, after Newey was recruited by the British team.  When Newey moved to rival McLaren in 1997, Willis was promoted, alongside Gavin Fisher, to take his role.

Willis joined the British American Racing outfit in 2001, which was later bought by Honda in 2005.  His status within the team became unclear as of 22 June 2006, following the appointment of Shuhei Nakamoto as Senior Technical Director. Willis had been told to stop going to races in order to focus on aerodynamics, which appeared to conflict with the appointment of Mariano Alperin-Bruvera to head the aerodynamics group using Honda's new full-size wind tunnel.  Willis eventually left the team later in the year. On 17 July 2007, Willis was hired by Red Bull Racing as the team's Technical Director, once again under Newey. He left Red Bull in July 2009 for unknown reasons.

Willis joined the new Hispania Racing F1 Team in March 2010. In September 2011 he left HRT, reportedly because the team had not assured him of necessary financial backing for designing the car for 2012 Formula One season and joined Mercedes as Technology director on 17 October 2011.

References

1959 births
Living people
Formula One designers
Aerodynamicists
Honda people
Mercedes-Benz in Formula One
Williams Grand Prix Engineering